Paul Dick Vrolijk (born 1964) has been Archdeacon of North West Europe since 2016.

Vrolijk was educated at the Delft University of Technology and Trinity College, Bristol. He was ordained deacon in 2004 and priest in 2005.  He was Non-stipendiary minister at St Michael, Stoke Gifford Bristol. He then served at Bordeaux, Chancelade, Limeuil, Lot-et-Garonne and Monteton.

References

1964 births
Delft University of Technology alumni
Alumni of Trinity College, Bristol
Archdeacons of North West Europe
Living people
21st-century Anglican priests